Bartolomé Santos de Risoba (1582–1657) was a Roman Catholic prelate who served as Bishop of Sigüenza (1649–1657), Bishop of León (1633–1649), and Bishop of Almería (1633).

Biography
Bartolomé Santos de Risoba was born in Saldaña, Spain on 6 March 1582.
On 6 June 1633, he was appointed during the papacy of Pope Urban VIII as Bishop of Almeria.
On 26 September 1633, he was appointed during the papacy of Pope Urban VIII as Bishop of León.
On 29 January 1634, he was consecrated bishop by Cristóbal Guzmán Santoyo, Bishop of Palencia, with Miguel Avellán, Titular Bishop of Siriensis, and Cristóforo Chrisostome Carletti, Bishop of Termia, serving as co-consecrators. 
On 21 June 1649, he was selected by the King of Spain as Bishop of Sigüenza and confirmed by Pope Innocent X on 9 December 1649.
He served as Bishop of Sigüenza until his death on 8 February 1657.

Episcopal succession
While bishop, he was the principal consecrator of:
Pedro Carrillo Acuña y Bureba, Bishop of Salamanca (1648); 
and the principal co-consecrator of:
Gonzalo Sánchez de Somoza Quiroga, Bishop of Mondoñedo (1639); and 
Juan Queipo de Llano Flores, Bishop of Pamplona (1639).

References

External links and additional sources
 (for Chronology of Bishops) 
 (for Chronology of Bishops) 
 (for Chronology of Bishops) 
 (for Chronology of Bishops) 

17th-century Roman Catholic bishops in Spain
Bishops appointed by Pope Urban VIII
Bishops appointed by Pope Innocent X
1582 births
1657 deaths